The Faculty of Medicine and Dentistry at University of Alberta is located in Edmonton, Alberta, Canada. Established in 1913, it is one of the oldest medical schools in Western Canada and is composed of 21 departments, two stand-alone divisions, 9 research groups, and 24 research centers and institutes. Educational, clinical and research activities are conducted in 29 buildings on or near the University of Alberta north campus.

The Faculty of Medicine & Dentistry is home to more than 1,400 support staff and 2,760 tenure-track and clinical educators, including six National 3M Teaching Fellows, Canada's most prestigious teaching award for post-secondary instructors. According to an economic impact report conducted in 2013, the Faculty of Medicine & Dentistry generated approximately $2 billion to the Alberta economy in 2012.

Education

The Faculty of Medicine & Dentistry, in 2018–19, had a research budget of $166 million.

The school runs the Scottish-Canadian Medical Programme jointly with the University of St Andrews School of Medicine and the University of Edinburgh Medical School, widely considered one of the top medical schools in the world in terms of reputation and research output.

Students study their undergraduate degree at St Andrews, and train clinically at both Edinburgh and Alberta. Students graduate at the University of Edinburgh with both Canadian and British training. A vast majority of students get placed back in Canada or the United States for residency, with the remaining opting to practice in the United Kingdom.

Research

The Faculty of Medicine & Dentistry offers four fully accredited undergraduate programs: doctor of medicine, doctor of dentistry, Bachelor of Science in medical laboratory science, and a diploma or Bachelor of Science in dental hygiene. The Bachelor of Science in radiation therapy, established in 2013, underwent accreditation review in fall 2016. It also offers more than 50 residency programs fully accredited by the Royal College of Physicians and Surgeons of Canada and 20 graduate programs centered in the health sciences.

The Faculty of Medicine & Dentistry has more than 2,600 learners in its undergraduate, graduate, residency, and postdoctoral education programs and has graduated nearly 14,000 health professionals and researchers.

Notable alumni

Faculty
James Collip – played a role in the development of insulin
Ban Tsui – developed the Tsui Test, a simple protocol using a low current electrical stimulation test to confirm catheter location in the epidural space during procedures.
John Carter Callaghan – Performed first open-heart surgery in Canada in 1956.
Gary Lobay & Henry Shumizu – part of the team of surgeons to perform Canada's first successful limb replantation in 1974 
Gary Lobay - first microsurgery in western Canada in 1974
Henry Shumizu - co-founder of western Canada's first burn treatment center
Lorne Tyrrell – created the first drug treatment of hepatitis B and 2015 Killiam Prize recipient. Former dean (1994-2004) and member of the Order of Canada.
Ray Rajotte – international diabetes leader, renown for work related to the Edmonton Protocol islet transplantation procedure
James Shapiro – member of the team that pioneered the Edmonton Protocol and continues to work to improve islet transplants
Richard Fedorak – internationally renowned gastroenterologist specializing in inflammatory bowel disease. Former dean of the faculty (2016).
Michael Houghton – co-discoverer of hepatitis C
Tak Wah Mak – first to identify and clone T-cell receptor genes
Joseph B. Martin (MD ’62) – member of the team that discovered a biomarker that led to locating the gene associated with Huntington's disease.
Jonathan White – co-founder of Surgery 101 podcast and National 3M Teaching Fellow
Arya Sharma – Canadian obesity expert
Lori West – Canada Research Chair in Cardiac Transplantation and director of the Canada National Transplant Research Program.
Toshifumi Yokota - pioneered antisense oligonucleotide-mediated therapeutics for muscular dystrophy.

References

University of Alberta
Medical schools in Canada